WGHW (88.1 FM) is a radio station licensed to Lockwoods Folly Town, North Carolina, United States, and serving the Wilmington area. The station airs a Christian format and is owned by Peace Baptist Church of Wilmington, NC.

History
WGHW was constructed in 2006 by Church Planters of America as one of several stations in its "Old Paths Radio Network". A 2016 license to cover earned the station a $3,000 fine from the FCC, for having installed the antenna at a different height than authorized.

Church Planters sold the station to Peace Baptist Church of Wilmington, NC for $250,000 in January 2019; the sale was consummated on April 18, 2019. The church planned to program a full-service Christian format.

References

External links

GHW
Radio stations established in 2006
2006 establishments in North Carolina